The Aviation Week Network is a New-York based B2B publishing and event production company. The company was owned and published by McGraw-Hill until it was purchased by Penton Media in 2013. It was then bought by Informa in 2016

The Aviation Week Network is best known for its flagship magazine, Aviation Week & Space Technology.

Publications 
The Aviation Week Network publishes three sector specific print magazines: Aviation Week & Space Technology, Business & Commercial Aviation and Air Transport World. It distributes ShowNews, a daily printed show report, at major international air shows.

It also publishes a number of email market briefings targeted at the defense, space, airline, airport and business aviation sectors including Aviation Daily, Aerospace Daily & Defense Report, SpeedNews and The Weekly of Business Aviation.

Conference and events 
The Aviation Week Network's conference and exhibitions have predominantly specialized in the aircraft maintenance, repair and overhaul (MRO) industry for the past two decades. The group currently produces six MRO events around the world, with its flagship North American conference attracting some 10,000 attendees.

Since its acquisition by Penton Media, the group took over manufacturing and supply chain conferences, which are run under the SpeedNews banner.

The Aviation Week Network runs two major awards ceremonies: Aviation Week's Laureate Awards and the Air Transport World Industry Achievement Awards. The Laureates focus on achievements in aerospace and defense technology and innovation, and have been dubbed the 'Oscars' of the aerospace industry. ATW's industry awards focus on airline achievements.

Business aviation 
Since its acquisition by Penton Media, the Aviation Week Network absorbed a number of business aviation products and services under its umbrella. These include: Ac-U-Kwik, a flight planning app for pilots; Aircraft Bluebook, a valuation service for business aircraft sales; and Air Charter Guide which provides destination information to brokers and charter operators.

Website 
The group's website primarily comprises editorial content that is curated from its various publications. The majority of content is behind a subscriber-only paywall, but it also includes a selection of free-to-read articles alongside blogs, videos and photo galleries, which are all free to access. The website has 2.2 million monthly page views.

Publication editors 
 Aviation Week & Space Technology: Joseph C. Anselmo, Editor-in-Chief
 Air Transport World: Karen Walker, Editor-in-Chief
 Aerospace & Defense Daily: Jefferson Morris, Editor-in-Chief
 Aviation Daily: Mark Nensel, Managing Editor
 Business & Commercial Aviation: William Garvey, Editor-in-Chief
 The Weekly of Business Aviation: Molly McMillin, Managing Editor
 ShowNews: John Morris, Editor-in-Chief
 SpeedNews: Steve Costley, Managing Editor

International partners 
A number of publications in key markets outside the U.S. carry the Aviation Week Network logo on their masthead. These include Russia's Air Transport Observer; the Chinese language CANNews, International Aviation, Business & General Aviation and Aviation Maintenance & Engineering.

References

Publishing companies based in New York City